Hashim al-Shaykh, also known by his nom de guerre Abu Jaber Shaykh is a rebel commander during the Syrian Civil War who is a senior leader of Tahrir al-Sham. He had reportedly resigned from his position in Ahrar al-Sham where he served as a senior commander to help command and direct the merger. Abu Jaber is a Salafist Muslim with a jihadist ideology, which is reflected in the ideology of the group he leads.

Pre-war activities 
Abu Jaber received a bachelor's degree in mechanical engineering at the University of Aleppo. After this, he worked at the Defence Factories near as-Safira. His Salafist activities led to him being arrested by the Syrian government several times. In 2005, he was imprisoned in the Sednaya Prison, infamous for holding a number of other Salafist prisoners who were later released.

Syrian Civil War 
On 25 September 2011, during the early phase of the Syrian Civil War, Abu Jaber was released from Sednaya Prison along with a number of other Salafist and jihadist political prisoners. He joined Harakat Fajr ash-Sham al-Islamiya and fought alongside the al-Nusra Front. He led a subgroup within Harakat Fajr ash-Sham al-Islamiya called the Mus‘ab ibn 'Umair Battalion, which became one of the founding members of Ahrar al-Sham. As of 2017, Abu Jaber was one of the three surviving founding figures of Ahrar al-Sham.

In September 2014, the founder and commander of Ahrar al-Sham, Hassan Aboud, was assassinated along with 45 of his fighters in a bombing in the Idlib Governorate. Abu Jaber replaced his position and became the overall commander of Ahrar al-Sham. He resigned and was replaced by Muhannad al-Masri (Abu Yahia al-Hamawi) in September 2015. An Ahrar al-Sham spokesman described Abu Jaber's leadership as the "hardest" period of the group.

On 15 February 2016, during the northern Aleppo offensive, 8 rebel factions pledged allegiance to Abu Jaber and established the Army of Aleppo to fight the Syrian Armed Forces and the Syrian Democratic Forces, including the Army of Revolutionaries.

On 28 January 2017, Abu Jaber and dozens of other Ahrar al-Sham commanders declared their resignation from Ahrar al-Sham as five major Salafist and jihadist rebel groups led by the al-Nusra Front merged into Tahrir al-Sham. Abu Jaber became the group's emir. Abu Jaber is one of the three surviving founding leaders of Ahrar al-Sham.

According to analyst Charles Lister in Twitter, Abu Jaber released a speech on 8 February 2017, In which he called Shia Islam the "enemy"

On 1 October 2017, Abu Jaber resigned from his position as the general commander of Tahrir al-Sham, being replaced by Abu Mohammad al-Julani. Abu Jaber took another position as the head of HTS's Shura council.

See also 
Abu Mohammad al-Julani
Hassan Soufan

References 

1968 births
Living people
People from Aleppo Governorate
Syrian Islamists
Syrian Salafis
Critics of Shia Islam
People of the Syrian civil war
Al-Qaeda leaders
Leaders of Islamic terror groups